Ngarango Otainui Island is an Island privately owned by Arzan Hajee and Arif Hajee. It is situated in the Manukau Harbour in Auckland, New Zealand. The Island is 5 km from the Auckland Airport and 10 km from Auckland CBD (as the crow flies). It can be visible from One Tree Hill. The land area is approx. 3288 square meters. This is one of the smallest privately owned Islands in New Zealand.

The island, traditionally known as Ngā Rango e Rua o Tainui, is known as the final resting place of the skids which were used to transport the Tainui migratory canoe across Te Tō Waka, the Ōtāhuhu portage.

See also

 Mangere Inlet
 List of islands of New Zealand
 List of islands
 Desert island

References

Manukau Harbour
Uninhabited islands of New Zealand
Islands of the Auckland Region
Private islands of New Zealand
Māngere-Ōtāhuhu Local Board Area